is a train station in Toyono, Toyono District,  Osaka Prefecture, Japan.

Lines
Nose Electric Railway
Myōken Line

Adjacent stations

Railway stations in Osaka Prefecture
Stations of Nose Electric Railway
Railway stations in Japan opened in 1978